AFAC can refer to:
Agencia Federal de Aviación Civil (Federal Civil Aviation Agency or ACAF), a government agency of Mexico
Air Force Administrative College, a training institute of the Indian Air Force
Arab Fund for Arts and Culture (AFAC)
Australasian Fire and Emergency Service Authorities Council